Argentochiloides meridionalis is a moth in the family Crambidae. It was described by Graziano Bassi in 1999. It is found in South Africa.

References

Endemic moths of South Africa
Crambinae
Moths described in 1999
Moths of Africa